Black dog or blackdog may refer to:

Arts and entertainment

Fictional entities
 Black Dog, a bio-robot in the 1982 Bulgarian animated science fiction film The Treasure Planet
 The Black Dog, an inn in 2015–2016 British drama TV series The Coroner
 Black Dog, a pirate in Robert Louis Stevenson's Treasure Island
 Black Dogs, a group of students in the Boarding School Juliet manga series

Film and television
 Black Dog (film), a 1998 American film
 Black Dog: Being A Teacher, a 2019 South Korean television series
 "Black Dog", a 2002 episode of the American TV series That '70s Show (season 5)
 "Blackdog", a 2005 two-part episode of the British TV series The Commander season 2

Literature
 Black Dog (novel), by Stephen Booth, 2000
 Black Dogs, by Ian McEwan, 1992
 Black Dog, a children's book by Levi Pinfold, winner of the 2013 Kate Greenaway Medal

Music
 The Black Dog (band), a British band, and their label Black Dog Productions
 "Black Dog", a song by Jesse Winchester, 1970
 "Black Dog" (Led Zeppelin song), by Led Zeppelin, 1971 
 "Black Dog" (Arlo Parks song), 2020
 "Black Dog", a song by Poster Children from the 1997 album RTFM
 "Black Dogs!", a song by Genesis Owusu from the 2021 album Smiling with No Teeth

Businesses and brands
 Black Dog Books (Australian publisher)
 Black Dog Books (American publisher)
 Black Dog & Leventhal Publishers, an American publisher
 Black Dog Publishing, a British publishing company
 Black Dog Institute, an Australian institute for the treatment of mood disorders such as depression
 Black Dog Scotch Whisky, bottled and marketed by United Spirits Limited
 The Black Dog (restaurant), on Martha's Vineyard, Massachusetts, U.S.
 The Black Dog, Dublin, a former prison in Ireland
 Black Dog Salvage, a salvage company in the 2012–2020 American reality TV series Salvage Dawgs

Folklore and mythology
 Black dog (folklore), a spectral black dog from English folklore

Places
 Black Dog, Devon, England
 Black Dog Lake, in Minnesota, U.S.
 Blackdog, Aberdeen, Scotland
 Black Dog Halt railway station, a former halt in Wiltshire, England

Other uses
 a dog with black fur
 Major depressive disorder (the term black dog was coined by Samuel Johnson and popularised by Winston Churchill)
 Black dog (coin), a coin in the Caribbean, starting under the reign of Queen Anne of Great Britain
 Black Dog (Osage chief) (1780–1848), and the name of his son
 Black Dog II, the son of Black Dog, a company commander of the Osage Battalion, an 1863–1865 Native American unit of the Confederate States Army
 BlackDog, a 2005 pocket-sized, self-contained computer

See also
 
 
 Black dog syndrome, a tendency for black dogs not to be adopted from animal shelters
 Anubis, an ancient Egyptian god, depicted as a black canine or a man with a black canine head
 Hellhound, a supernatural dog in folklore